The Pepperdine Waves men's basketball team is an American college basketball team that represents Pepperdine University in NCAA Division I, the highest level of intercollegiate athletics sanctioned by the National Collegiate Athletic Association (NCAA). The Waves compete in the West Coast Conference and are coached by Lorenzo Romar.  The Waves have qualified for the NCAA Division I men's basketball tournament 13 times. Thirty-one former Waves have been drafted by the NBA, and 17 former Waves have played in the NBA, including Dennis Johnson, an inductee of the Naismith Memorial Basketball Hall of Fame.

The team's last appearance in the NCAA Division I men's basketball tournament was in 2002. Their home arena is the Firestone Fieldhouse. This is a multi-purpose facility that hosts volleyball, basketball, as well as other athletic events. They share this facility with the Pepperdine Waves women's basketball team.

History

Tom Asbury, an assistant coach at Pepperdine for nine seasons, succeeded Jim Harrick as head coach. Asbury was very successful in his first stint at Pepperdine, becoming the conference coach of the year twice and compiling a 125–59 record in his first six years. He took the Waves to the NCAA Tournament in 1991, 1992 and 1994, as well as two NIT appearances, three regular-season WCC titles and three WCC tournament championships.

After 19 years away, Lorenzo Romar was announced as the new head men's basketball coach at Pepperdine on March 12, 2018, returning for his second stint with the school. On March 24, 2021, Romar's Waves beat Coastal Carolina 84–61 to win the 2021 College Basketball Invitational, securing the program's first-ever postseason championship.

Postseason results

NCAA tournament results
The Waves have qualified for the NCAA Division I men's basketball tournament 13 times. Their combined record is 5–14.

NIT results
The Waves have qualified for the National Invitation Tournament (NIT) six times. Their combined record is 3–6.

CBI results
The Waves have qualified for the College Basketball Invitational (CBI) three times. In their third appearance, the Waves won the 2021 CBI Championship. Their combined record is 3–2.

NAIA tournament results
The Waves have qualified for the NAIA men's basketball tournament seven times. Their combined record is 11–7.

Waves in the NBA
Thirty-one former Waves have been drafted by the NBA, and 17 former Waves have played in the NBA, including Dennis Johnson, an inductee of the Naismith Memorial Basketball Hall of Fame.

For 34 consecutive seasons, from the 1976–77 NBA season to the 2010–2011 NBA season, at least one former Wave played in an NBA game.

References

External links